The 2017–18 First League of the Republika Srpska was the twenty-third season of the First League of the Republika Srpska, the second tier football league of Bosnia and Herzegovina, since its original establishment and the sixteenth as a second-tier league.

Clubs 

 FK Drina Zvornik
 FK Kozara Gradiška
 FK Napredak Donji Šepak
 FK Podrinje Janja
 FK Rudar Prijedor
 FK Slavija Istočno Sarajevo
 FK Sloboda Mrkonjić Grad
 FK Sloga Doboj
 FK Sutjeska Foča
 FK Tekstilac Derventa
 FK Zvijezda 09 Etno Selo Stanišići
 FK Željezničar Banja Luka

Regular season

Promotion round

Relegation round

Season statistics

Top goalscorers

See also
2017–18 Premier League of Bosnia and Herzegovina
2017–18 First League of the Federation of Bosnia and Herzegovina
2017–18 Bosnia and Herzegovina Football Cup

References

External links
League statistics at SportSport.ba
Official site for the Football Federation of Bosnia and Herzegovina
Official site for the Football Federation of the Republika of Srpska

 

Bos
2
First League of the Republika Srpska seasons